Michel Salesse (born 3 January 1955) is a French fencer. He won a gold medal in the team épée at the 1980 Summer Olympics and a silver in the same event at the 1984 Summer Olympics.

References

External links
 

1955 births
Living people
French male épée fencers
Olympic fencers of France
Fencers at the 1980 Summer Olympics
Fencers at the 1984 Summer Olympics
Olympic gold medalists for France
Olympic silver medalists for France
Olympic medalists in fencing
Sportspeople from Algiers
Medalists at the 1980 Summer Olympics
Medalists at the 1984 Summer Olympics